Marie Sophie Jeanne Laisné (born 21 March 1870; year of death unknown) was a French operatic soprano with the Opéra-Comique. She started her career as Sophie in the first French production of Massenet's Werther, and went on to create the roles of Aurore in Jules Massenet's Le portrait de Manon,  Jeanne in Benjamin Godard's La Vivandière, La Duchesse de Fronsac in Henri Hirschmann's L'amour à la Bastille, and Henriette in Ernest Lefèvre-Dérodé's Le follet.  Other notable roles include Micaela in Bizet's Carmen and as Mimi in Puccini's La bohème.

Biography 
Laisné studied at the Conservatoire de Paris under Ernest Boulanger, graduating in 1892, after which she was engaged by the Opéra-Comique. She made her opera début on 16 January 1893 as Sophie in the first Paris production of Jules Massenet's Werther, which also featured Marie Delna, Max Bouvet, and Guillaume Ibos in leading roles.

She created the role of Aurore in Jules Massenet's Le portrait de Manon, a sequel to his earlier Manon, at the Opéra-Comique on 8 May 1894. Years after des Grieux's tragic romance, he has adopted a son, who is in love with Aurore, who, unbeknownst to des Grieux, is Manon's niece. The two young lovers have to remind him of his own tragic youth, in order to get him to accept that love should reign in their generation. In connection with the première, writing in La Nouvelle Revue (1 June 1894) the author and librettist Louis Gallet refers to "la charmante Mlle Laisné, qui joue et chante à ravir le rôle d'Aurore" (the charming Miss Laisné who plays and sings the role of Aurore so ravishingly).  Le Matin discussed her charming voice and effective execution, and Le Figaro discussed how she agreeably chirped and trilled her way through Aurore.

In 1898, Le Matin praised her performance in Fidelio, stating "Mlle Lai[s]nè a une voix d'une pureté délicieuse, qu'elle sait conduire avec un art consommé" (Miss Lai[s]né has a voice of delicious purity, which she knows to use with consummate art.)

Laisné married Jules Victor Henri Libent on 20 September 1901 in Paris (8th arrondissement).

Repertoire 
 1893: Sophie in Massenet's Werther, first French production, at the Opéra-Comique, 16 January
 1893: Geneviève in Alfred Bruneau's L'Attaque du moulin at the Opéra-Comique
 1894: Created the role of Aurore in Massenet's Le portrait de Manon at the Opéra-Comique, 8 May.
 1894: Nanette in Verdi's Falstaff at the Opéra-Comique, from 14 November
 1895: Virginie in Victor Massé's Paul et Virginie at the Opéra-Comique, from 26 February
 1895: Created the role of Jeanne in  Benjamin Godard's La Vivandière at the Opéra-Comique, 1 April
 1896: Isabelle in Ferdinand Hérold's Le pré aux clercs at the Opéra-Comique, 19 January
 1896: L'Ombre heureuse in Gluck's Orphée et Eurydice at the Opéra-Comique, 6 March.
 1897: Created the role of La Duchesse de Fronsac in Henri Hirschmann's L'amour à la Bastille at the Opéra-Comique, 14 December
 1898: Philomèle in Delibes' Le roi l'a dit at the Opéra-Comique, 13 March
 1898: Philine in Thomas' Mignon at the Opéra-Comique, 24 April
 1898: Rafaela in Daniel Auber's Haydée, ou Le secret at the  Opéra-Comique, 12 February
 1898: Virginie in Victor Massé's Paul et Virginie at the Opéra-Comique, 24 November
 1898: Marceline in Beethoven's Fidelio at the Opéra-Comique, 30 December
 1899: Henriette in Halévy's L'eclair at the Opéra-Comique, 5 June
 1899: L'Ombre heureuse in Gluck's Orphée et Eurydice at the Opéra-Comique, 20 December
 1900: Jeanette in Victor Massé's Les noces de Jeannette at the Opéra-Comique, 7 January
 1900: Philine in Thomas' Mignon at the Opéra-Comique, 19 January
 1900: Anna in Boieldieu's La dame blanche at the Opéra-Comique, 2 February
 1900: Created the role of Henriette in Ernest Lefèvre-Dérodé's Le follet, 1 May
 1900: Sœur Euphémie in François Devienne's Les Visitandines, 15 May

From 1900, she also appeared as Micaela in Bizet's Carmen, Suzel in Erlanger's Le Juif Polonais, Baucis in Gounod's Philémon et Baucis, and Mimi in Puccini's La bohème.

References

Further reading 
L'Europe artiste, Paris, 1853–1904, viewable on Gallica
Le Ménestrel, Paris, 1833–1940, viewable on Gallica
Le Monde artiste puis "illustré", Paris, 1862–1914, viewable on Gallica

1870 births
Singers from Paris
French operatic sopranos
Conservatoire de Paris alumni
Year of death unknown
19th-century French women opera singers